In geometry, the quarter hypercubic honeycomb (or quarter n-cubic honeycomb) is a dimensional infinite series of honeycombs, based on the hypercube honeycomb. It is given a Schläfli symbol q{4,3...3,4} or Coxeter symbol qδ4 representing the regular form with three quarters of the vertices removed and containing the symmetry of Coxeter group  for n ≥ 5, with  =  and for quarter n-cubic honeycombs  = .

See also 
 Hypercubic honeycomb
 Alternated hypercubic honeycomb
 Simplectic honeycomb
 Truncated simplectic honeycomb
 Omnitruncated simplectic honeycomb

References 

 Coxeter, H.S.M. Regular Polytopes, (3rd edition, 1973), Dover edition, 
 pp. 122–123, 1973. (The lattice of hypercubes γn form the cubic honeycombs, δn+1)
 pp. 154–156: Partial truncation or alternation, represented by q prefix
 p. 296, Table II: Regular honeycombs, δn+1
 Kaleidoscopes: Selected Writings of H. S. M. Coxeter, edited by F. Arthur Sherk, Peter McMullen, Anthony C. Thompson, Asia Ivic Weiss, Wiley-Interscience Publication, 1995,  
 (Paper 22) H.S.M. Coxeter, Regular and Semi Regular Polytopes I, [Math. Zeit. 46 (1940) 380-407, MR 2,10] (1.9 Uniform space-fillings)
 (Paper 24) H.S.M. Coxeter, Regular and Semi-Regular Polytopes III, [Math. Zeit. 200 (1988) 3-45] See p318 
 

Honeycombs (geometry)
Polytopes